{{DISPLAYTITLE:C21H22N2O2}}
The molecular formula C21H22N2O2 may refer to:

 Strychnine, a toxic, colorless, bitter, crystalline alkaloid used as a pesticide
 Vinorine, an indole alkaloid isolated from Alstonia